WNSL (100.3 FM, "SL100") is a Top 40 music formatted radio station licensed to Laurel, Mississippi, serving the Laurel-Hattiesburg Arbitron market.

Programming
SL100 is an affiliate of the syndicated Johnjay and Rich.  It is also an affiliate of the syndicated On Air with Ryan Seacrest and Dawson McAllister Live.

History

WNSL-FM went on the air March 10, 1959, a simulcast of WNSL AM 1260 (today's WHJA at 890 AM). WNSL-AM-FM was founded by Granville Walters, a former news reporter and host at WAML, the first radio station in Laurel.  Walters was the general manager of WNSL until 1983, and for most of those years, he reported the news in the morning drive slot. For years, WNSL-AM-FM had a country music format (the AM moniker was Dixie's 1260 for a time), and it was famous for the "Masonite Whistle", a music and news program broadcast from 6:00 - 6:30 a.m. and sponsored by Masonite Corporation, for the benefit of its employees. A common phrase used in the program was "for those getting up or those getting in", presumably to cater to employees of the night and morning shifts. This program continued as a simulcast on both AM and FM stations, despite changes in formats and call letters, until 1984. At one point, the FM format was changed to R&B and was known as Soul-100, before adopting the current Top 40 format in the late 1970s. The AM format remained country until the change in FM format.  Then, the AM station broke off completely as R&B outlet WQIS "Super Q 1260".

In 1981, WNSL built a new transmitter tower near Moselle, Mississippi, with an ERP of 33,000 watts. In 1985, when WNSL built a new transmitter tower near Ellisville, Mississippi, the transmitter in Moselle became the new transmitter tower for WQIS.  WNSL successfully tapped into the Hattiesburg market, targeting students at the University of Southern Mississippi, competing with Top 40 station WHSY "Y-104". In 1983, Granville Walters retired and sold his part in WNSL/WQIS to Bob Holladay, who was the son of Mr. Walters' partner, Ed Holladay of Meridian.  Under Bob Holladay's watch, the station gained prominence as a Top 40 station. Holladay managed to lure DJs from other larger markets, particularly Meridian, to WNSL.  The new tower built in 1985 was 1,000 feet over average terrain, and WNSL upgraded to an ERP of 100,000 watts.  This new tower was capable of handling multiple stations and initially was shared  with WHER-FM 103.7 in Hattiesburg, an easy listening FM station; upon the inauguration of the new tower, WNSL changed its legal identification to WNSL Laurel-Hattiesburg-Meridian in an effort to tap into the Meridian radio market and compete with Top 40 station WJDQ "Q-101". As part of the campaign, Holladay hired Mike Golden, a former news anchor with WTOK-TV in Meridian, as news director.  The station also arranged for a relayed broadcast at 100.5 on cable in Meridian, as the radio signal was not strong in areas on the north side of Meridian.  This campaign proved to yield little fruit, and within 18 months, the legal identification was changed back to WNSL Laurel-Hattiesburg and Mike Golden was gone.

Holladay expanded the company through acquisition of other stations but eventually sold WNSL and WQIS to Design Media in 1988. Design Media sold the stations to Cumulus Media in 1999. In October 2000, Cumulus announced an agreement to sell this station to Clear Channel Communications as part of a large station swap and sale, including seven Cumulus stations in the Laurel-Hattiesburg radio market.  The deal was approved by the FCC on December 19, 2000, and the transaction was consummated on January 18, 2001.

References

External links

NSL
Contemporary hit radio stations in the United States
Radio stations established in 1957
1957 establishments in Mississippi
IHeartMedia radio stations